RGR can refer to:
 Royal Gurkha Rifles
 RGR (gene)
 Relative growth rate (speed of plant growth)]
 The stock ticker for Sturm, Ruger & Co., Inc.